English lexicology and lexicography is that field in English language studies which examines English lexicon, English word-formation, the evolution of vocabulary and the composition of English dictionaries.

Further reading
Bauer, L. 1993. English Word-formation, “Cambridge textbooks in Linguistics”, Cambridge, Cambridge University Press
Baugh, A.C./ Cable, Th. 1993.  A History of the English Language. London: Routledge
Burkett, Eva Mae. 1939. American Dictionaries of the English Language before 1861. New York: ...
Friend, J.H. 1967. The Development of American Lexicography 1798–1864. The Hague: Mouton
Green, J. 1996. Chasing the Sun. Dictionary-Makers and the Dictionaries They Made. London: Jonathan Cape
Hartmann, R.R.K. ed. 1986. The History of Lexicography. Papers from the Dictionary Research Centre Seminar at Exeter, March 1986. Amsterdam: J. Benjamins
Murray, J.A.M. 1900.  Evolution of English Lexicography. Oxford: Oxford University Press
Nielsen, S. 2008. The Effect of Lexicographical Information Costs on Dictionary Making and Use. Lexikos 18: 170–189.
Starnes, D.T./ Noyes, G.E. 1946.  The English Dictionary from Cawdrey to Johnson, 1604–1755.  Chapel Hill, NC: University of North Carolina Press
Stein, G. 1985.  The English Dictionary before Cawdrey. (Lexicographica, Series Maior, 9).  Tübingen: Niemeyer
Murray, K.M. Elizabeth. 1977. Caught in the Web of Words: James Murray and the Oxford English Dictionary. Oxford: Oxford University Press
Reddick, A. 1990. The Making of Johnson's Dictionary 1746–1773. Cambridge: Cambridge University Press
Snyder, K.A. 1990. Defining Webster: Mind and Morals in the Early Republic. University Press of America